The Institute of Swimming is a swimming educational organisation based in Loughborough, Leicestershire.

History
It was known as the Institute of Swimming Teachers and Coaches (ISTC), and was based on Granby Street in Loughborough town centre, and previous to that in the 1990s on Forest Road (B5350) at Dawson House. As the IoS it was previously based at Harold Fern House in the town.

The ISTC was formed by the ASA in the 1970s. It became the Institute of Swimming on 15 July 2004. The organisation was incorporated as a company on 6 October 1983.

Function
It supplies the main training for the Amateur Swimming Association (ASA). Swimming schools and coaches can be registered with the organisation so long as they have adequate coaching qualifications. This register is available to the public searching for qualified swimming instructors. In this respect it is similar to a trade association for swimming teachers. Comprehensive insurance is provided as part of membership.

It published the magazine Swimming (when the ISTC), now called Swimming Times, published with the ASA.

Professional qualifications
Fellows of the Institute of Swimming can use the F. I. S. T. C designation after their name.

Structure
SportPark, 3 Oakwood Drive, Loughborough, Leicestershire, LE11 3QF

See also 
 UK Coaching Certificate (UKCC)
 Institute of Scientific and Technical Communicators (also similarly known as ISTC)

References

External links
 

Organisations based in Leicestershire
Qualification awarding bodies in the United Kingdom
Sport in Loughborough
Sports academies
Swimming coaches
Swimming in the United Kingdom
Swimming organizations